Pascale Montpetit (born 28 July 1960) is a French Canadian actress. In 1990 she won a Best Actress Genie Award for Darrell Wasyk's H, and again in 2002 for Mario Azzopardi's Savage Messiah,

She has also won two Gémeaux Awards, one Jutra Award and a Mons International Festival of Love Films Award.

External links
 

1960 births
Living people
Canadian film actresses
Canadian television actresses
French Quebecers
Best Actress Genie and Canadian Screen Award winners
Best Supporting Actress Genie and Canadian Screen Award winners
Actresses from Quebec
Place of birth missing (living people)
Best Actress Jutra and Iris Award winners
20th-century Canadian actresses
21st-century Canadian actresses